Losing Our Sons is a 2012 American documentary film produced by Americans for Peace and Tolerance, a Boston-based education non-profit company. A. R. Maezav is its executive producer, co-director and co-writer; and Ilya I Feoktistov is its producer, co-director, and co-writer. The film was edited by Brian Keith. Losing Our Sons tells of two American families whose lives intersected through an act of violence.

Losing Our Sons was created as an educational tool for the public, meant to expose the threat to American civil society posed by Islamic extremism and the failure of American leadership to protect the public from this threat.

Synopsis

Two fathers have lost their sons to an Islamist movement whose growth is enabled by naïve and misguided political correctness, willful ignorance, and simple cowardice. Carlos Bledsoe, born and raised in an African-American Baptist family, firebombed a rabbi's house and then killed Pvt. Andy Long outside an army recruiting office in Little Rock, Arkansas. Carlos becomes a jihadist through his connections to mosques and Imams in Nashville, as part of a problem that is being ignored—or facilitated—by local civic and religious leaders and the media; whose politically correct views blind Americans to a truth that few dare engage.

The film documents the ideology preached in Nashville's universities and local mosques. It contains actual sermons given by local Islamic leaders railing against Jews and Christians as well as against American democracy. This vividly contrasts with scenes of local Jewish and Christian leaders embracing these very same Imams, who pose as moderates but whose beliefs and teachings are unveiled for all to see. The local newspaper, The Tennessean, which has been blinded by political correctness, publishes glowing reports about Islamic leaders while ignoring their easily found hate sermons, which are posted on the Internet for all to see.

When Daris Long and Melvin Bledsoe try to explain to the United States Congress what happened to their sons, they are met with a mix of hostility, indifference, and – from a few – sympathy. Obama Administration officials are shown ducking and denying the Islamist problem, officially corrupting our language and terminology by restricting terminology describing radical Islam, so that reality cannot be accurately conveyed – all for the sake of not "offending" or inciting Muslims. Melvin Bledsoe's warning to Congress pithily describes the Obama Administration's confusion: "We're worried about stepping on their toes; and they’re talking about stamping us out."

The film ends with a final warning to America from Melvin Bledsoe: "It happened to my son today, tomorrow, your son."

See also
The Third Jihad: Radical Islam's Vision For America, a related 2008 documentary film

References

External links
 
 
Documentary films critical of Islam
American documentary films
2012 documentary films
2010s English-language films
2010s American films

Islamism in the United States